The Northwestern State Lady Demons softball team represents Northwestern State University in NCAA Division I college softball. The team participates in the Southland Conference. The Lady Demons are currently led by head coach Donald Pickett. The team plays its home games at Lady Demon Diamond located on the university's campus.

In 2013, the Lady Demons' home field, Lady Demon Diamond, received a $466,000 renovation including a partially covered grandstand with chairback seating, a new press box, and concession stand.

History
Softball began at Northwestern State in 1979. The Lady Demons have competed in every season since that time. The program has won four Southland Conference regular season titles (1991, 1998, 1999, 2000), five Southland Conference tournament titles (1998, 2000, 2002, 2013, 2014). As conference tournament champions, the Lady Demons won the conference's automatic bid to the NCAA Division I Softball Championship tournament. As of the start of the 2015 season the Lady Demons have an all-time record of 924–912–3 and a Southland Conference record of 344–335.

The Lady Demons tie for second most regular season conference championships. The team has also performed well in the Southland conference tournament. At five, the Lady Demons are second in the number of conference tournament championships. In addition to winning five tournament titles, the team has the best tournament winning percentage (.651) with an overall record of 43–23 and has the second most conference tournament appearances of current conference membership at 16. Five Lady Demons have been named the conference tournament Most Valuable Player. Twenty-nine Lady Demons have been named to the conference All Tournament team with ten of those players named to the team multiple times.

Year-by-year results
Sources:

Post Season Play

NCAA Division I Tournament results
The Lady Demons have appeared in five NCAA Division I Tournaments. Their combined record is 0–10.

Source:

Honors and awards

Southland Conference
Sources: 
Player of the Year
Rhonda Rube, 1989, 91,
Annie Johnston, 2002
Hitter of the Year
Brandy Kenney, 1998 (Shared)
Annie Johnston, 2002
Anne LaHaye, 1990
Pitcher of the Year
Cindy Leggett, 1999
Newcomer of the Year
Rhonda Rube, 1989
Nancy Percle, 1990
Annie Johnston, 2001
Freshman of the Year
Jessica Holaway, 2000
Coach of the Year
Rickey McCalister, 1989, 90, 91
Gay McNutt, 1998, 99, 00
All-Conference 1st Team

Misty Carraway, 1997
Ginger Craig, 1988
Lindsey Danzy, 2003, 04
Amy Grisham, 1991, 92
Annie Johnston, 2001, 02
Shante Jones, 1998
Brandy Kenney, 1998, 99
Anne LaHaye, 1990
Cindy Leggett, 1999
Erin Mancuso, 2001
Nicole Martin, 2003, 05
Crista Miller, 2002
Sarina Noack, 2006
Sonja Olsen, 1988, 89, 90, 91
Jennifer Owens, 1998
Erin Palomarez, 2001
Missy Pereira, 1990
Claudia Percle, 1990
Nancy Percle, 1990
Brianna Rodriguez, 2013
Rhonda Rube, 1989, 90, 91
Rustie Stevens, 1992
Shannon Straty, 1999
Linette Stuart, 1999
Brittany Virgoe, 2014
Amber Welker, 2000

See also
List of NCAA Division I softball programs

References

External links